Rhinoceros binagadensis, sometimes called Dicerorhinus binagadensis, is an extinct species of rhinoceros that lived in the second half of the Last Glacial Period. The remains were discovered in 1938 at the Binagadi asphalt lake in the southeast of the Binagadi village, on the Absheron Peninsula of Azerbaijan.

This species was first described in 1955 (and more in 1960) by Rahimbek Dzhafarov. Like modern rhinos, Binagadi had two elongated horns located one after the other. The teeth of the Binagadi rhinoceros distinguish it from the Asian species and bring it closer to the African ones.  Major injury to the rib cage of a R. binagadensis specimen was examined and described by Gadzhiev and Gadzhiev (1951). Its status as an independent species has been considered doubtful, with A.V. Shpansky noting in that numerous aspects the fossil is very similar to woolly rhinoceros and is possibly a member of that species.

In 2010, the skeleton of this rhino was exhibited in Naples at the Città della Scienza Science Museum.

References 

Prehistoric rhinoceroses
Pleistocene mammals
Mammals of Europe
Mammals of Asia
Fossil taxa described in 1955